Sigurður Jónsson may refer to:

 Sigurður Jónsson (alpine skier) (1959-1996), Icelandic skier
 Sigurður Jónsson (footballer) (born 1966), Icelandic footballer and coach
 Sigurður Jónsson (swimmer) (1922–2019), Icelandic swimmer
 Sigurður Th. Jónsson (1924–2003), Icelandic swimmer
 Sigurður Örn Jónsson (born 1973), Icelandic footballer

See also 
 Sigurd Jonsson, Norwegian nobleman